Eskişehirspor Magazine is Turkish football club Eskişehirspor's official monthly magazine. The magazine was first released in August 2008.

References

External links
Eskişehirspor Club official site.
 Eskişehirspor Magazine official site.

2008 establishments in Turkey
Association football magazines
Magazines established in 2008
Mass media in Eskişehir
Sports mass media in Turkey
Magazines published in Turkey
Turkish-language magazines
Monthly magazines published in Turkey